Marit Kjellsdotter Söderström (born 25 October 1962 in Västerås) is a Swedish sailor. She won a silver medal in the 470 class at the 1988 Summer Olympics with Birgitta Bengtsson with a final total of 61.0 points.

References

External links
 
 
 
 

1962 births
Living people
Swedish female sailors (sport)
Olympic sailors of Sweden
Sailors at the 1988 Summer Olympics – 470
Olympic silver medalists for Sweden
Olympic medalists in sailing
Laser Radial class sailors
470 class world champions
Medalists at the 1988 Summer Olympics
Europe class world champions
World champions in sailing for Sweden
Sportspeople from Västerås